The 2001 Montreal Expos season was the 33rd season in franchise history.

Offseason
December 21, 2000: Tim Raines signed as a free agent with the Montreal Expos.
December 21, 2000: Curtis Pride was signed as a free agent with the Montreal Expos.

Spring training
In 2001, the Expos held spring training at Roger Dean Stadium in Jupiter, Florida, a facility they shared with the St. Louis Cardinals. It was their fourth season there.

Regular season
April 6, 2001 – In an era where the only bright spot for Expos fans was Vladimir Guerrero, another bright spot emerges as hero Tim Raines returns to Montreal for one last hurrah. In Rock's first at-bat back at the Big O he drew a walk off Glendon Rusch. Throughout the whole at-bat every Expo fan at the stadium stood and clapped for Timmy...all 45,183 of them.
 In a season that ended with talks of contraction, Felipe Alou was released as the Expos manager. He was replaced by former Chicago White Sox manager Jeff Torborg. Future White Sox manager Ozzie Guillén was a coach for the Expos.

Opening Day lineup 
Source

Season standings

National League East

Record vs. opponents

Transactions
June 12, 2001: The Expos signed Rob Ducey as a free agent.
July 31, 2001: The Expos traded Milton Bradley to the Cleveland Indians for Zach Day.
July 31, 2001: The Expos traded Ugueth Urbina to the Boston Red Sox for Tomokazu Ohka and Rich Rundles (minors).

Roster

Game log

|- align="center" bgcolor="bbffbb"
| 1 || April 2 || @ Cubs || 5–4 (10) || Lloyd (1–0) || Fyhrie (0–1) || Urbina (1) || 38,466 || 1–0
|- align="center" bgcolor="bbffbb"
| 2 || April 4 || @ Cubs || 3–2 || Reames (1–0) || Wood (0–1) || Urbina (2) || 23,070 || 2–0
|- align="center" bgcolor="ffbbbb"
| 3 || April 5 || @ Cubs || 1–2 || Tapani (1-0) || Armas (0-1) || Fassero (1) || 16,758 || 2–1
|- align="center" bgcolor="bbffbb"
| 4 || April 6 || Mets || 10–6 || Thurman (1-0) || Rose (0-1) || — || 45,183 || 3–1
|- align="center" bgcolor="bbffbb"
| 5 ||  April 7 || Mets || 10-0  || Vázquez (1-0) || Trachsel (0–1) || — || 15,317 || 4–1
|- align="center" bgcolor="bbffbb"
| 6 ||  April 8 || Mets || 5–2 || Peters (1-0) || Leiter (0-1) || Urbina (3) || 11,321 || 5–1
|- align="center" bgcolor="bbffbb"
| 7 ||  April 9 || Cubs || 7–5 || Lloyd (2–0) || Aybar (0–1) || Urbina (4) || 5,776 || 6–1
|- align="center" bgcolor="ffbbbb"
| 8 ||  April 10 || Cubs || 2–4 || Tapani (2-0) || Armas (0-2) || Fassero (3) || 8,314 || 6–2 
|- align="center" bgcolor="ffbbbb"
| 9 ||  April 11 || Cubs || 2–4 || Tavárez (2-0) || Thurman (1-1) || Fassero (4) || 9,632 || 6–3
|- align="center" bgcolor="ffbbbb"
| 10 || April 13 || Marlins || 3–9 || Dempster (2-0)  || Vázquez (1-1) || — || 12,554 || 6–4
|- align="center" bgcolor="bbffbb"
| 11 || April 14 || Marlins || 8–2 || Reames (2–0) || Clement (1-1) || — || 9,514 || 7–4
|- align="center" bgcolor="ffbbbb"
| 12 || April 15 || Marlins || 3–6 || Grilli (1-1)  || Armas (0–3) || Alfonseca (1) || 8,090 || 7–5
|- align="center" bgcolor="ffbbbb"
| 13 || April 16 || @ Mets || 3–4 || Reed (2-1) || Thurman (1-2) || Benítez (2) || 18,241 || 7–6
|- align="center" bgcolor="ffbbbb"
| 14 || April 17 || @ Mets || 0–4 || Rusch (1-0) || Peters (1-1) || — || 20,177 || 7–7
|- align="center" bgcolor="bbffbb"
| 15 || April 18 || @ Mets || 7–1 || Vázquez (2–1) || Trachsel (0-3) || — || 20,721 || 8–7
|- align="center" bgcolor="ffbbbb"
| 16 || April 19 || @ Marlins || 2–5 || Looper (1-1) || Strickland (0–1) || Alfonseca (3) || 10,940 || 8–8
|- align="center" bgcolor="ffbbbb"
| 17 || April 20 || @ Marlins || 1–5 ||  Grilli (2-1) || Armas (0-4) || — || 11,551 || 8–9
|- align="center" bgcolor="ffbbbb"
| 18 || April 21 || @ Marlins || 0–5 || Penny (1-0) || Thurman (1-3) || — || 17,587 || 8–10
|- align="center" bgcolor="bbffbb"
| 19 || April 22 || @ Marlins || 6–2 || Peters (2-1) || Núñez (1-2) || — || 10,609 || 9–10
|- align="center" bgcolor="ffbbbb"
| 20 || April 24 || @ Cardinals || 2–7 || Kile (3-2) || Vázquez (2–2) || — || 28,345 || 9–11
|- align="center" bgcolor="ffbbbb"
| 21 || April 25 || @ Cardinals || 2–5 || Benes (1-1)  || Reames (2-1) || Stechschulte (1) || 28,858 || 9–12 
|- align="center" bgcolor="bbffbb"
| 22 || April 26 || @ Cardinals || 4–3 (15) || Yoshii (1-0) || James (1-1) || — || 42,373 || 10–12
|- align="center" bgcolor="bbffbb"
| 23 || April 27 || @ Brewers || 6–1 || Thurman (2-3) || Leiter (0–1) || — || 26,350 || 11–12
|- align="center" bgcolor="ffbbbb"
| 24 || April 28 || @ Brewers || 4–8 || Sheets (1–2) || Peters (2–2) || — || 40,877 || 11–13
|- align="center" bgcolor="ffbbbb"
| 25 || April 29 || @ Brewers || 0–10 || Wright (3–2)  || Vázquez (2–3) || — || 32,700 || 11–14
|-

|- align="center" bgcolor="ffbbbb"
| 26 || May 1 || Diamondbacks || 3–8  || Schilling (4–0) || Reames (2–2) || — || 4,340 || 11–15
|- align="center" bgcolor="bbffbb"
| 27 || May 2 || Diamondbacks || 4–3 || Armas (1-4) || Anderson (0–3) || Lloyd (1) || 4,352 || 12–15
|- align="center" bgcolor="ffbbbb"
| 28 || May 3 || Diamondbacks || 1–2 || Kim (2-1) || Lloyd (2-1) || Prinz (2) || 4,788 || 12–16
|- align="center" bgcolor="ffbbbb"
| 29 || May 4 || Astros || 4–8 || Miller (5–1) || Vázquez (2–4) || — || 6,017 || 12–17
|- align="center" bgcolor="ffbbbb"
| 30 || May 5 || Astros || 3–4 || Reynolds (2–2) || Reames (2–3) || Wagner (6) || 20,541 || 12–18
|- align="center" bgcolor="ffbbbb"
| 31 || May 6 || Astros || 7–13 || Elarton (4–3) || Telford (0-1) || — || 6,041 || 12–19
|- align="center" bgcolor="ffbbbb"
| 32 || May 7 || @ Giants || 2–6 || Ortiz (5–1) || Armas (1–5) || — || 38,249 || 12–20
|- align="center" bgcolor="ffbbbb"
| 33 || May 8 || @ Giants || 1–9 || Estes (3-2) || Thurman (2-4) || — || 38,123 || 12-21
|- align="center" bgcolor="bbffbb"
| 34 || May 9 || @ Giants || 8–0 || Vázquez (3–4) || Hernández (2-5) || — || 38,074 || 13-21
|- align="center" bgcolor="ffbbbb"
| 35 || May 10 || @ Giants || 0–13 || Rueter (4-3) || Reames (2–4) || — || 41,059 || 13-22
|- align="center" bgcolor="ffbbbb" 
| 36 || May 11 || @ Rockies || 4–13 || Neale (3-1) || Peters (2-3) || — || 43,680 || 13-23
|- align="center" bgcolor="bbffbb"
| 37 || May 12 || @ Rockies || 8–4 || Armas (2–5) || Thomson (0-1) || — || 43,730 || 14-23
|- align="center" bgcolor="bbffbb"
| 38 || May 13 || @ Rockies || 14–10 || Lloyd (3-1) || Astacio (4-3) || — || 42,235 || 15-23
|- align="center" bgcolor="bbffbb"
| 39 || May 15 || Dodgers || 2–0 || Vázquez (4–4) || Park (4–4) || — || 4,714 || 16-23
|- align="center" bgcolor="ffbbbb"
| 40 || May 16 ||Dodgers || 2–7 || Dreifort (3-2) || Reames (2–5) || — || 4,759 || 16-24
|- align="center" bgcolor="bbffbb"
| 41 || May 17 || Dodgers || 3–1 || Armas (3–5) || Gagné (1-3) || Urbina (5) || 12,926 || 17-24
|- align="center" bgcolor="bbffbb"
| 42 || May 18 || Padres || 3–1 || Thurman (3-4) || Jarvis (2-4) || Urbina (6) || 6,851 || 18-24
|- align="center" bgcolor="ffbbbb"
| 43 || May 19 || Padres || 7–20 ||  Serrano (1-1) || Yoshii (1-1) || — || 7,297 || 18-25
|- align="center" bgcolor="ffbbbb"
| 44 || May 20 || Padres || 3–5 || Jones (2-5) || Vázquez (4–5) || Hoffman (7) || 7,269 || 18-26
|- align="center" bgcolor="ffbbbb"
| 45 || May 21 || Mets || 3–6 || Rusch (3–3) || Reames (2-6) || Benítez (6) || 5,449 || 18-27
|- align="center" bgcolor="bbffbb"
| 46 || May 22 || Mets || 3–0 || Armas (4–5) || Gonzalez (1-2) || Urbina (7) || 4,186 || 19-27
|- align="center" bgcolor="ffbbbb"
| 47 || May 23 || Mets || 2–4 || Leiter (2-3) || Peters (2-4) || Benítez (6) || 5,292 || 19–28
|- align="center" bgcolor="ffbbbb"
| 48 || May 25 || @ Phillies || 8–10 || Oropesa (1–0) || Urbina (1-1) || — || 12,538 || 19–29
|- align="center" bgcolor="bbbbbb"
| — || May 26 || @ Phillies || colspan=6 | Postponed (rain): Rescheduled for May 27 as part of a doubleheader. 
|- align="center" bgcolor="ffbbbb"
| 49 || May 27 (1) || @ Phillies || 5–7 || Brock (2-0) || Reames (2-7) || Mesa (14) || rowspan=2| 22,451 || 19–30
|- align="center" bgcolor="bbffbb"
| 50 || May 27 (2) || @ Phillies || 7–3 || Armas (5-5) || Byrd (0-1) || || 20–30
|- align="center" bgcolor="ffbbbb"
| 51 || May 28 || @ Braves || 3–5 (8)|| Smoltz (1-2) || Yoshii (1-2) || Rocker (13) || 24,904 || 20–31
|- align="center" bgcolor="ffbbbb"
| 52 || May 29 || @ Braves || 4–7 || Pérez (3–4) || Blank (0–1) || Rocker (14) || 26,818 || 20–32 
|- align="center" bgcolor="bbffbb"
| 53 || May 30 || @ Braves || 4–3 || Vázquez (5–5) || Maddux (4–5) || Urbina (8) || 27,936 || 21–32
|- align="center" bgcolor="ffbbbb"
| 54 || May 31 || Phillies || 2–5 || Cormier (3–0) || Strickland (0–2) || Mesa (16) || 5,042 || 21–33
|-

|- align="center" bgcolor="ffbbbb"
| 55 || June 1 || Phillies || 2–13 || Chen (2–3) || Reames (2–8) || — || 5,267 || 21–34
|- align="center" bgcolor="bbffbb"
| 56 || June 2 || Phillies || 12–5 || Armas (6-5) || Wolf  (4–5) || — || 7,810 || 22–34
|- align="center" bgcolor="bbffbb"
| 57 || June 3 || Phillies || 10–3  || Yoshii (2–2) || Daal (6–1) || — ||  6,504 || 23–34
|- align="center" bgcolor="ffbbbb"
| 58 || June 5 || Braves || 1–3 || Maddux (5–5) || Vázquez (5–6) || Rocker (15) || 7,017 || 23–35
|- align="center" bgcolor="ffbbbb"
| 59 || June 6 || Braves || 0–2 || Burkett (5–4) || Irabu (0–1) || Rocker (16) || 5,102 || 23–36
|- align="center" bgcolor="ffbbbb"
| 60 || June 7 || Braves || 3–4 (11) || Marquis (1–0) || Strickland (5–7) || Ligtenberg (1) || 4,575 || 23–37
|- align="center" bgcolor="ffbbbb"
| 61 || June 8 || @ Orioles || 0–5 || Towers (3–1) || Blank (0–2) || — || 39,940 || 23–38
|- align="center" bgcolor="bbffbb"
| 62 || June 9 || @ Orioles || 4–2 || Lloyd (4–1) || Ryan (2–2) || Urbina (9) || 39,521 || 24–38
|- align="center" bgcolor="ffbbbb"
| 63 || June 10 || @ Orioles || 2–3 || Johnson (6–3) || Vázquez (5–7) || Groom (2) || 36,868 || 24–39
|- align="center" bgcolor="bbffbb"
| 64 || June 12 || @ Yankees || 2–1 (12) || Strickland (1–3) || Mendoza (2–1) || — || 30,034 || 25–39
|- align="center" bgcolor="ffbbbb"
| 65 || June 13 || @ Yankees || 3–9 || Clemens (8–1) || Irabu (0–2) || — || 24,960 || 25–40
|- align="center" bgcolor="ffbbbb"
| 66 || June 14 || @ Yankees || 6–9 || Keisler (1–1) || Yoshii (2–3) || Rivera (19) || 33,306 || 25–41
|- align="center" bgcolor="ffbbbb"
| 67 || June 15 || Blue Jays || 3–9 || Carpenter (1–0) || Vázquez (5–8) || — || 8,692 || 25–42
|- align="center" bgcolor="bbffbb"
| 68 || June 16 || Blue Jays || 7–2 || Blank (1–2) || Loaiza (5–7) || || 11,113 || 26–42
|- align="center" bgcolor="bbffbb"
| 69 || June 17 || Blue Jays || 4–1 || Mota (2–0)  || Quantrill (5–1) || — || 8,440 || 27–42
|- align="center" bgcolor="ffbbbb"
| 70 || June 18 || @ Mets || 1–2 || Wendell (3–2) || Yoshii (2–4) || Benítez (12) || 32,569 || 27–43
|- align="center" bgcolor="ffbbbb"
| 71 || June 19 || @ Mets || 1–4 || White (1–0) || Mota (1–1) || Franco (2)|| 27,578 || 27–44
|- align="center" bgcolor="ffbbbb"
| 72 || June 20 || @ Mets || 3–4 || Leiter (4–5) || Vázquez (5–9) || Benítez (13) || 28,617 || 27–45
|- align="center" bgcolor="bbffbb"
| 73 || June 21 ||  @ Mets || 10–3 || Blank (2–2) || Appier (4–7) || — || 32,668 || 28–45
|- align="center" bgcolor="bbffbb"
| 74 || June 22 || @ Pirates || 11–5 || Armas (7–5) || Schmidt (3–3) || — || 33,439 || 29–45
|- align="center" bgcolor="ffbbbb"
| 75 || June 23 || @ Pirates || 4–7 || Ritchie (3–8) || Yoshii (2–5) || Williams (14) || 38,169 || 29–46
|- align="center" bgcolor="bbffbb"
| 76 || June 24 || @ Pirates || 11–4 || Mattes (1–0) || Beimel (3–3) || — || 36,826 || 30–46
|- align="center" bgcolor="bbffbb"
| 77 || June 25 || @ Marlins || 3–1 || Vázquez (6–9) || Burnett (5–4) || Urbina (10) || 10,300 || 31–46
|- align="center" bgcolor="ffbbbb"
| 78 || June 26 || @ Marlins || 0–3  || Penny (7–1) || Thurman (3–5) || Alfonseca (17) || 11,180 || 31-47
|- align="center" bgcolor="ffbbbb"
| 79 || June 27 || @ Marlins || 1–9 || Sánchez (1–0) || Armas (7–6) || — || 12,349 || 31-48
|- align="center" bgcolor="bbffbb"
| 80 || June 29 || Pirates || 12–3 || Mattes (2–0) || Beimel (3–4) || — || 6,504 || 32-48
|- align="center" bgcolor="bbffbb"
| 81 || June 30 || Pirates || 7–6 || Lloyd (5–1) || Williams (2–3) || — || 8,711 || 33-48
|-

|- align="center" bgcolor="bbffbb"
| 82 || July 1 ||Pirates || 9–3 || Thurman (4–5) || Anderson  (4–8) || — || 6,631 || 34-48
|- align="center" bgcolor="ffbbbb"
| 83 || July 3 || Marlins || 0–7 || Dempster (9–8) || Armas (7–7) || — || 4,690 || 34-49
|- align="center" bgcolor="bbffbb"
| 84 || July 4 || Marlins || 9–6 || Lloyd (6–1) || Clement (4–6) || Urbina (11) || 4,899 || 35-49
|- align="center" bgcolor="bbffbb"
| 85 || July 5 || Marlins || 9–6 || Vázquez (7–9) || Smith (4–5) || Urbina (12) || 5,253 || 36-49
|- align="center" bgcolor="bbffbb"
| 86 || July 6 || @ Blue Jays || 10–7 || Lloyd (7–1) || Quantrill (7–2) || Urbina (12) || 20,074 || 37-49
|- align="center" bgcolor="ffbbbb"
| 87 || July 7 || @ Blue Jays || 8–9 (11)|| Plesac (2–2) || Strickland (1–4) || — || 23,976 || 37-50
|- align="center" bgcolor="ffbbbb"
| 88 || July 8 || @ Blue Jays || 3–9 || Michalak (6–6) || Armas (7–8) || — || 31,012 || 37-51
|- style="text-align:center; background:#bbb;"
|colspan=9| All–Star Break (July 9–11)
|- align="center" bgcolor="ffbbbb"
| 89 || July 12 || Devil Rays || 10–0 || Sturtze (4–7) || Mattes (2–1) || — || 4,877 || 37-52
|- align="center" bgcolor="bbffbb"
| 90 || July 13 || Devil Rays || 2–6 || Vázquez (8–9) || Kennedy (3–3) || — || 4,277 || 38-52
|- align="center" bgcolor="bbffbb"
| 91 || July 14 || Devil Rays || 10–2 || Armas (8–8) || Rekar (1–11) || — || 5,471 || 39-52
|- align="center" bgcolor="ffbbbb"
| 92 || July 15 || Red Sox || 5–8 || Nomo (9–4) || Thurman (4–6) || Lowe (17) || 32,965 || 39-53
|- align="center" bgcolor="ffbbbb"
| 93 || July 16 || Red Sox || 5–6 || Pichardo (2–0) || Lloyd (7–2) || Lowe (18) || 16,005 || 39-54
|- align="center" bgcolor="bbffbb"
| 94 || July 17 || Red Sox || 11–7 || Mattes (3–1) || Wakefield (6–4) || — || 13,348 || 40-54
|- align="center" bgcolor="bbffbb"
| 95 || July 18 || Phillies || 7–6 || Urbina (1–1) || Cormier (5–2) || — || 5,157 || 41-54
|- align="center" bgcolor="bbffbb"
| 96 || July 19 || Phillies || 5–2 || Strickland (2–4) || Cormier (5–2) || Urbina (14) || 10,242 || 42-54
|- align="center" bgcolor="bbffbb"
| 97 || July 20 || @ Braves || 6–3 || Thurman (5–6) || Millwood (1–4) || Urbina (15) || 32,842 || 43-54
|- align="center" bgcolor="ffbbbb"
| 98 || July 21 || @ Braves || 1–2 (10) || Cabrera (6–2) || Lloyd (7–3) || — || 46,363 || 43-55
|- align="center" bgcolor="ffbbbb"
| 99 || July 22 || @ Braves || 2–8 || Maddux (13–5) || Mattes (3–2) || — || 29,082 || 43-56
|- align="center" bgcolor="bbffbb"
| 100 || July 23 || @ Phillies || 3–0 || Vázquez (9–9) || Daal (10–3) || — || 16,921 || 44-56
|- align="center" bgcolor="ffbbbb"
| 101 || July 24 || @ Phillies || 2–10 || Figueroa (2–2) || Armas (8–9) || — || 16,6996 || 44-57
|- align="center" bgcolor="ffbbbb"
| 102 || July 25 || @ Phillies || 4–8 || Person (9–5) || Thurman (5–7) || — || 27,555 || 44-58
|- align="center" bgcolor="bbffbb"
| 103 || July 26 || Braves || 3–2 (10) || Urbina (2–1) || Reed (3–2) || — || 7,635 || 45-58
|- align="center" bgcolor="ffbbbb"
| 104 || July 27 || Braves || 3–7 || Maddux (14–5) || Mattes (3–3) || — || 8,299 || 45-59
|- align="center" bgcolor="ffbbbb"
| 105 || July 28 || Braves || 5–10 || Glavine (10–5) || Vázquez (9–10) || — || 9,390 || 45-60
|- align="center" bgcolor="ffbbbb"
| 106 || July 29 || Braves || 1–8 || Burkett (8–8) || Armas (8–10) || — || 9,802 || 45-61
|- align="center" bgcolor="ffbbbb"
| 107 || July 31 || @ Diamondbacks || 1–3 || Schilling (15–5) ||  Muñoz (0–1) || || 27,726 || 45-62
|-

|- align="center" bgcolor="bbffbb"
| 108 || August 1 || @ Diamondbacks || 8–5 || Thurman (6–7) || Anderson (3–3) || Stewart (1) || 25,668 || 46-62
|- align="center" bgcolor="bbffbb"
| 109 || August 2 || @ Diamondbacks || 1–0 || Vázquez (10–10) || Lopez (5–14) || Stewart (2) || 28,688 || 47-62
|- align="center" bgcolor="ffbbbb"
| 110 || August 3 || @ Astros || 2–6 || Reynolds (10–10) || Armas (8–11) || — || 31,134 || 47-63
|- align="center" bgcolor="ffbbbb"
| 111 || August 4 || @ Astros || 1–4 || Oswalt (9–2) || Ohka (2–6) || — || 38,769 || 47-64
|- align="center" bgcolor="ffbbbb"
| 112 || August 5 || @ Astros || 1–4 || Villone (5–4) || Muñoz (0–2) || Wagner (25) ||  36,240 || 47-65
|- align="center" bgcolor="ffbbbb"
| 113 || August 7 || Cardinals || 1–3 || Kile (12–7) || Vázquez (10–11) || — || 7,760 || 47-66
|- align="center" bgcolor="bbffbb"
| 114 || August 8 || Cardinals || 6–5 (11) || Yoshii (3–5) || Hackman (0–2) || — || 6,611 || 48-66
|- align="center" bgcolor="ffbbbb"
| 115 || August 9 ||Cardinals || 6–9 || Morris (14–7) || Ohka (2–7) || — || 7,166 || 48-67
|- align="center" bgcolor="ffbbbb"
| 116 || August 10 || Brewers || 1–5 || Quevedo (1–1) || Thurman (6–8) || — || 4,917 || 48-68
|- align="center" bgcolor="ffbbbb"
| 117 || August 11 || Brewers || 0–6 || Suzuki (3–8) || Muñoz (0–3) || — || 5,843 || 48-69
|- align="center" bgcolor="bbffbb"
| 118 || August 12 || Brewers || 5–0 || Vázquez (11–11) || Haynes (7–15) || — || 6,280 || 49-69
|- align="center" bgcolor="bbffbb"
| 119 || August 14 || @ Dodgers || 4–1 || Lloyd (8–3) || Shaw (3–3) || — || 30,085 || 50-69
|- align="center" bgcolor="ffbbbb"
| 120 || August 15 || @ Dodgers || 1–13 || Carrara (10–6) ||  Pavano (0–1) || — || 43,049 || 50-70
|- align="center" bgcolor="bbffbb"
| 121 || August 16 || @ Dodgers || 7–3 || Reames (3–8) || Trombley (3–5) || — || 30,347 || 51-70
|- align="center" bgcolor="bbffbb"
| 122 || August 17 || @ Padres || 4–0 || Vázquez (12–11) || Lawrence (3–2) || — || 22,513 || 52-70
|- align="center" bgcolor="ffbbbb"
| 123 || August 18 || @ Padres || 3–4 || Jones (8–14) || Thurman (6–9) || Hoffman (31) || 31,485 || 52-71
|- align="center" bgcolor="bbffbb"
| 124 || August 19 || @ Padres || 2–1 ||  Armas (9–11) || Herndon (1–2) || Strickland (1) || 24,309 || 53-71
|- align="center" bgcolor="ffbbbb"
| 125 || August 21 || Giants || 2–10 || Ortiz (14–6) || Pavano (0–2) || — ||  8,937 || 53-72
|- align="center" bgcolor="bbffbb"
| 126 || August 22 || Giants || 7–1 || Vázquez (13–11) || Estes (8–8) || — || 8,217 || 54-72
|- align="center" bgcolor="ffbbbb"
| 127 || August 23 || Giants || 5–10 || Rodríguez (7–1) || Lloyd (8–4) || || 7,990 || 54-73
|- align="center" bgcolor="bbffbb"
| 128 || August 24 || Reds || 6–4 || Stewart (1–0) || Brower (6–8) || Strickland (2) || 5,191 || 55-73
|- align="center" bgcolor="ffbbbb"
| 129 || August 25 || Reds || 2–4 || Reitsma (6–13) || Thurman (6–10) || Graves (22) || 6,852 || 55-74
|- align="center" bgcolor="ffbbbb"
| 130 || August 26 || Reds || 4–17 || Acevedo (4–5) || Muñoz (0–4) || — || 11,783 || 55-75
|- align="center" bgcolor="bbffbb"
| 131 || August 28 || @ Braves || 7–0 || Vázquez (14–11) || Millwood (4–6) || Mesa (37) || 23,131 || 56-75
|- align="center" bgcolor="ffbbbb"
| 132 || August 29 || @ Braves || 3–5 || Glavine (12–7) || Armas (9–12) || Smoltz (3) || 22,327 || 56-76
|- align="center" bgcolor="bbffbb"
| 133 || August 30 || @ Braves || 4–2 || Ohka (3–7) || Marquis (3–6) || Strickland (3) || 22,725 || 57-76
|- align="center" bgcolor="bbffbb"
| 134 || August 31 || @ Phillies || 5–1 || Thurman (7–10) || Figueroa (8–12) || Strickland (4) || 14,272 || 58-76
|-

|- align="center" bgcolor="ffbbbb"
| 135 || September 1 || @ Phillies || 1–4 || Person (13–6) || Pavano (0–3) || Mesa (35) || 16,770 || 58-77
|- align="center" bgcolor="bbffbb"
| 136 || September 2 || @ Phillies || 6–2 || Vázquez (15–11) || Mesa (1–2) || — || 20,871 || 59-77
|- align="center" bgcolor="ffbbbb"
| 137 || September 3 || Braves || 0–5 || Glavine (13–7) || Ohka (3–8) || — || 6,748 || 59-78
|- align="center" bgcolor="ffbbbb"
| 138 || September 4 || Braves || 2–3 || Karsay (2–4) || Strickland (2–5) || — || 3,613 || 59-79
|- align="center" bgcolor="bbffbb"
| 139 || September 5 || Braves || 10–4 || Thurman (8–10) || Burkett (11–10) || — || 3,806 || 60-79
|- align="center" bgcolor="ffbbbb"
| 140 || September 6 || Phillies || 0–3 || Person (14–6) || Pavano (0–4) || Mesa (36) || 3,406 || 60-80
|- align="center" bgcolor="bbffbb"
| 141 || September 7 || Phillies || 4–2 || Vázquez (16–11) || Duckworth (2–1) || Stewart (3) || 4,451 || 61-80
|- align="center" bgcolor="ffbbbb"
| 142 || September 8 || Phillies || 0–6 || Wolf (7–10) || Ohka (3–9) || — || 5,650 || 61-81
|- align="center" bgcolor="ffbbbb"
| 143 || September 9 || Phillies || 4–12 || Politte (2–2) || Lloyd (8–5) || — || 5,480 || 61-82
|- align="center" bgcolor="bbbbbb"
| — || September 11 || @ Marlins || colspan=6 | Postponed (September 11 attacks); Rescheduled for October 2.|- align="center" bgcolor="bbbbbb"
| — || September 12 || @ Marlins || colspan=6 | Postponed (September 11 attacks); Rescheduled for October 3.|- align="center" bgcolor="bbbbbb"
| — || September 13 || @ Marlins || colspan=6 | Postponed (September 11 attacks); Rescheduled for October 4.|- align="center" bgcolor="bbbbbb"
| — || September 14 || @ Mets || colspan=6 | Postponed (September 11 attacks); Rescheduled for October 5.|- align="center" bgcolor="bbbbbb"
| — || September 15 || @ Mets || colspan=6 | Postponed (September 11 attacks); Rescheduled for October 6.|- align="center" bgcolor="bbbbbb"
| — || September 16 || @ Mets || colspan=6 | Postponed (September 11 attacks); Rescheduled for October 7.|- align="center" bgcolor="ffbbbb"
| 144 || September 17 || Marlins || 6–10 || Bones (4–4) || Mota (1–2) || — || 3,013 || 61-83
|- align="center" bgcolor="ffbbbb"
| 145 || September 18 || Marlins || 1–3 || Penny (8–9) || Thurman (8–11) || Alfonseca (26) || 2,917 || 61-84
|- align="center" bgcolor="bbffbb"
| 146 || September 19 || Marlins || 5–2 || Pavano (1–4) || Beckett (1–1) || Strickland (5) ||  2,887 || 62-84
|- align="center" bgcolor="bbffbb"
| 147 || September 20 || Rockies || 8–3 || Lloyd (9–5) || Powell (4–3) || — || 3,037 || 63-84
|- align="center" bgcolor="ffbbbb"
| 148 || September 21 || Rockies || 9–11 (11) || Davis (2–4) || Mota (1–3) || — || 10,510 || 63-85
|- align="center" bgcolor="bbffbb"
| 149 || September 22 || Rockies || 3–1 || Yoshii (4–5) || Elarton (4–9) || Strickland (6) ||  9,707 || 64-85
|- align="center" bgcolor="ffbbbb"
| 150 || September 23 ||Rockies || 3–5 || Speier (4–2) || Stewart (1–1) || Jiménez (16) || 9,282 || 64-86
|- align="center" bgcolor="ffbbbb"
| 151 || September 25 || Mets || 0–2 || Appier (9–10) || Pavano (1–5) || — || 4,166 || 64-87
|- align="center" bgcolor="ffbbbb"
| 152 || September 26 || Mets || 2–5 || Rusch (8–10) || Armas (9–13) ||  Benítez (42) || 5,314 || 64-88
|- align="center" bgcolor="ffbbbb"
| 153 || September 27 || Mets || 6–12 || White (4–5) || Strickland (2–6) || — || 6,968 || 64-89
|- align="center" bgcolor="bbffbb"
| 154 || September 28 || @ Reds || 7–6 || Stewart (2–1) || Graves (6–5) || Strickland (7) || 18,762 || 65-89
|- align="center" bgcolor="ffbbbb"
| 155 || September 29 || @ Reds || 4–7 || Dessens (10–13) || Yoshii (4–6) || Graves (30) || 20,490 || 65-90
|- align="center" bgcolor="ffbbbb"
| 156 || September 30 || @ Reds || 4–5 || Sullivan (6–1) || Eischen (0–1) || Graves (31) || 20,394 || 65-91
|-

|- align="center" bgcolor="ffbbbb"
| 157 || October 2 || @ Marlins || 3–4 || Burnett (10–12) || Armas (9–14) || Looper (2) || 7,737 || 65-92
|- align="center" bgcolor="bbffbb"
| 158 || October 3 || @ Marlins || 2–0 || Stewart (3–1) || Acevedo (2–5) || Strickland (8) || 8,211 || 66-92
|- align="center" bgcolor="ffbbbb"
| 159 || October 4 || @ Marlins || 2–6 || Penny (10–10) || Yoshii (4–7) || — || 8,091 || 66-93
|- align="center" bgcolor="bbffbb"
| 160 || October 5 || @ Mets || 8–6 || Thurman (9–11) || Leiter (11–11) || Strickland (9) || 10,281 || 67-93
|- align="center" bgcolor="ffbbbb"
| 161 || October 6 ||  @ Mets || 0–4 || Appier (11–10) || Pavano (1–6) || — || 15,025 || 67-94
|- align="center" bgcolor="bbffbb"
| 162 || October 7 ||  @ Mets || 5–0 || Reames (4–8) || Rusch (8–12) || — || 15,540 || 68-94
|-

Attendance

The Expos drew 642,745 fans during the 2001 season, and were 16th in attendance among the 16 National League teams. Their highest attendance for the season was for the home opener on April 6 against the New York Mets, which drew 45,183 fans, while their lowest was for a game on September 19 against the Florida Marlins, which only 2,887 fans attended.

Player stats

 Batting Note: Pos = Position; G = Games played; AB = At bats; R = Runs scored; H = Hits; 2B = Doubles; 3B = Triples; HR = Home runs; RBI = Runs batted in; AVG = Batting average; SB = Stolen basesComplete offensive statistics are available here.PitchingNote: Pos = Position; W = Wins; L = Losses; ERA = Earned run average; G = Games pitched; GS = Games started; SV = Saves; IP = Innings pitched; R = Runs allowed; ER = Earned runs allowed; BB = Walks allowed; K = StrikeoutsComplete pitching statistics are available here.Award winners
 Javier Vázquez, National League Pitcher of the Month, July
2001 Major League Baseball All-Star Game

Farm system

References

External links
 2001 Montreal Expos at Baseball Reference 2001 Montreal Expos at Baseball Almanac''

Montreal Expos seasons
Montreal Expos
2000s in Montreal
2001 in Quebec